Diadegma meliloti is a wasp first described by Horstmann in 1973. It is a member of the genus Diadegma and family Ichneumonidae. No subspecies are listed.

References 

meliloti

Insects described in 1973